José de la Cruz may refer to:

 José de la Cruz (writer) (1746–1829), Filipino writer
 José de la Cruz Sánchez (1749–1878), Californio statesman and ranchero
 José María de la Cruz (1799–1875), Chilean soldier
 José de la Cruz Porfirio Díaz Mor (1830–1915), better known as Porfirio Díaz, Mexican President
 José de la Cruz Mena (1874–1907), Nicaraguan composer
 José de la Cruz (footballer) (born 1952), Paraguayan football goalkeeper
 José Luis de la Cruz (born 2000), Dominican football right-back

See also
 Jose Cruz (disambiguation)